Isabelo Caiban Abarquez is the current serving Bishop of the Roman Catholic Diocese of Calbayog, Philippines.

Early life 
Isabelo was born on 8 July 1959, in Panlaan, Dumanjug, Cebu, Philippines.

Priesthood 
He was ordained a priest of Cebu on 23 June 1987 by Ricardo Vidal.

Episcopate 
On 27 December 2002 he was appointed auxiliary bishop of Cebu, Philippines, and titular bishop of Talaptula. He was ordained a bishop on 18 February 2003 at Cebu Metropolitan Cathedral by Ricardo Vidal. On 19 June 2004 he was appointed auxiliary bishop of Palo, Philippines. He was appointed Bishop of Calbayog, Philippines, on 5 January 2007 and installed on 8 March 2007.

References

External links

1959 births
Living people
21st-century Roman Catholic bishops in the Philippines